Collothecidae is a family of rotifers belonging to the order Collothecaceae.

Genera:
 Collotheca Harring, 1913
 Stephanoceros Ehrenberg, 1832

References

Collothecaceae
Rotifer families